Priolo may refer to:

 Alquist Priolo Special Studies Zone Act, earthquake safety legislation, California, USA
 Borgo Priolo, municipality in Lombardy, Italy
 Priolo, local name for the Azores bullfinch
 Priolo (horse), French racehorse
 Priolo Gargallo, municipality in Sicily, Italy